Motor Booty Affair is the seventh album by funk band Parliament. Released on November 20, 1978. It contains two of the group's most popular tracks, "Rumpofsteelskin" and "Aqua Boogie (A Psychoalphadiscobetabioaquadoloop)" which went to number one on the Billboard Soul Singles chart.

Artist Overton Loyd prepared the cover of Motor Booty Affair.  The main release consisted of a gate-fold album cover featuring a pop-up rendition of the city of Atlantis, with Loyd's artwork on the front and back covers. His illustrations included cartoon portraits of some of the "characters" mentioned in the songs on the album, including "Mr. Wiggles". It also included cardboard cutout figures featuring Loyd's cartoon illustrations of most of the characters mentioned in the songs. There was also a picture disk, with Loyd's illustration printed directly on the vinyl LP. The album was Parliament's fifth consecutive gold album (500,000 copies sold).

Track listing

Personnel

Snorkel Singing Air Tank Harmonics:

Jaws: George Clinton, Garry Shider, J.S. Theracon, Gary "Bone" Cooper, Ron Ford, Ray Davis, Bernie Worrell
The Choral Reef (er, Bubbly Vocalizations): Debbie Wright, Jeanette Washington, Mallia Franklin, Shirley Hayden, Cheryl James, Lynn Mabry, Dawn Silva, Linda Brown, Richard "Kush" Griffith, Raymond Spruell, Mike "Clip" Payne, Joey Zalabok, Robert "P-Nut" Johnson, Larry Heckstall, Overton Loyd

Liquid Licks (Motor-Madness Musicians):

Guitar: Michael Hampton, Garry Shider, J.S. Theracon, Phelps "Catfish" Collins, Bootsy Collins
Bass: Cordell "Boogie" Mosson, Bootsy Collins, Rodney "Skeet" Curtis, J.S. Theracon
Drums: Tyrone Lampkin, Bootsy Collins, Gary "Bone" Cooper, J.S. Theracon
Percussion: Larry Fratangelo
Horns: Fred Wesley, Richard "Kush" Griffith, Maceo Parker, Rick Gardner, Greg Boyer, Greg Thomas, Benny Cowan
Keyboards/Synthesizers: Bernie Worrell, J.S. Theracon

References

External links
 Motor Booty Affair at Discogs

 

Parliament (band) albums
1978 albums
Casablanca Records albums
Concept albums